William Speed (fl. 1384–1395) was an English politician.

He was a Member (MP) of the Parliament of England for Hereford in November 1384, 1385 and 1395.

References

Year of birth missing
Year of death missing
English MPs November 1384
People from Hereford
English MPs 1385
English MPs 1395